Esmil Antonio Rogers (born August 14, 1985) is a Dominican professional baseball pitcher for the Mariachis de Guadalajara of the Mexican League. He previously played in the KBO League for the Hanwha Eagles and Nexen Heroes, and in the Chinese Professional Baseball League (CPBL) for the CTBC Brothers. Rogers has also played in Major League Baseball (MLB) for the Colorado Rockies, Cleveland Indians, Toronto Blue Jays, and New York Yankees.

Professional career

Minor leagues
Rogers was signed as an amateur free agent in 2003 by the Colorado Rockies. Rogers began rookie league ball in 2006 with the Casper Rockies of the Pioneer League. The following season, he played for the Asheville Tourists of the Class A South Atlantic League. In 2008, Rogers played with the Class A Modesto Nuts of the California League. He played for the Tulsa Drillers of the Double-A Texas League before appearing with the Colorado Springs Sky Sox of the Triple-A Pacific Coast League.

Colorado Rockies
He was promoted to the Colorado Rockies in September 2009 and made his major league debut on September 12, 2009, giving up two runs and three hits in four innings in the team's 3–2 loss at San Diego. He returned to the Rockies in 2010, and pitched in 28 games, eight starts, compiling a 2–3 record, 6.13 ERA, and 1.67 WHIP.

Rogers compiled a 3–1 record as a starter in April 2011 despite a 6.33 ERA. Rogers replaced Ubaldo Jiménez, who was traded to the Cleveland Indians, in the pitching rotation after his trade to the Indians on July 30. He allowed one run on one hit and one walk over those five innings of relief, lowering his season-high ERA from 8.49 to 7.31. On June 12, 2012, the Rockies traded Rogers to the Indians for cash considerations after previously being designated for assignment by the Rockies. He had a 0–2 record and 8.06 ERA with the Rockies in 2012.

Cleveland Indians
Rogers replaced Matt LaPorta on the Indians' active roster on June 13, 2012. "We're hoping that getting him out of the Colorado ballpark and new surroundings, maybe we can cash in on a very good arm", said Indians manager Manny Acta.

Rogers went 3–1 with a 3.06 ERA with 54 strikeouts and 53 innings in 44 games for the Indians.

Toronto Blue Jays
On November 3, 2012, the Toronto Blue Jays announced that they had traded Mike Avilés and Yan Gomes to the Cleveland Indians for Rogers. Rogers made his first start as a Blue Jay against the Atlanta Braves on May 29, 2013. He pitched 3 innings and gave up 3 hits, with 2 walks and 4 strikeouts. Rogers would have received the win, but did not pitch the minimum 5 innings required to be the pitcher of record. On June 13, in his third start of the season, Rogers pitched 7 innings against Yu Darvish and the Texas Rangers, earning the win in a 3–1 game.

On June 18, starting against the Colorado Rockies for the first time in his career, Rogers took a no-hitter into the sixth inning and left with an 8–2 lead after pitching 6 innings. The Blue Jays would win the game 8–3 and extend their winning streak to seven games. The start, Rogers' fourth of the season, put his starters ERA at 1.71. Both manager John Gibbons and catcher J. P. Arencibia attributed Rogers' success to increased confidence and the use of his sinker. Rogers took the loss in a game on June 24 against the Tampa Bay Rays which ended the Blue Jays' 11-game winning streak. In the loss, Rogers gave up three consecutive home runs.

In January 2014, Rogers filed for salary arbitration with Toronto, but came to terms on a 1-year, $1.85 million contract on January 17. On May 23, Rogers was designated for assignment after opening the season with a 6.97 ERA in 16 appearances. He cleared waivers, and was assigned outright to the Triple-A Buffalo Bisons on May 24. His contract was selected on July 22, but he was again designated for assignment on July 27 without appearing for the team.

New York Yankees
On July 31, 2014, the New York Yankees claimed Rogers off waivers from the Blue Jays. He pitched three scoreless innings in his Yankees debut on August 3. On August 8, Rogers pitched five innings, allowed one run, and recorded the win in his first start as a Yankee.

After the 2014 season, the Yankees signed Rogers to a $1.48 million contract for the 2015 season. After working to a 6.27 ERA with 41 hits allowed in 33 innings, the Yankees outrighted him to the Scranton Wilkes-Barre Yankees of the Class AAA International League on June 13, 2015, removing him from the team's 40-man roster. He was later called back up on June 28, and outrighted again on July 1. He was released on July 31.

Hanwha Eagles
After his release from the Yankees, Rogers signed with the Hanwha Eagles of the KBO League. He made his Eagles debut as a starting pitcher against the LG Twins on August 6, 2015. He earned a win by throwing a complete game, where he struck out seven hitters and allowed just one run while surrendering three hits as the Eagles recorded a 4-1 victory. In his second start for the Eagles on August 11, 2015 against the KT Wiz, he recorded his second KBO victory where he pitched a complete game shutout in a 4-0 victory as he again allowed just three hits and he again struck out seven batters. Rogers thus became the first pitcher to throw two consecutive complete games in his first two KBO starts. He was released when the team signed Eric Surkamp on July 7, 2016.

Washington Nationals
On August 1, 2017, Rogers signed a minor league contract with the Washington Nationals.

Nexen Heroes
On October 27, 2017, the Nexen Heroes of the KBO League announced that they signed Rogers to a one-year contract for the 2018 season, worth $1.5 million. After breaking his finger, Rogers was released on June 20, 2018, in order to open up a spot for another foreign player on the roster.

Guerreros de Oaxaca
On February 1, 2019, Rogers signed with the Guerreros de Oaxaca of the Mexican League. He was released on July 20, 2019.

CTBC Brothers
On January 9, 2020, Rogers signed with the CTBC Brothers of the Chinese Professional Baseball League. He became a free agent following the season. However, he later re-signed with the Brothers on February 20, 2021. In 2021, Rogers posted a 2–5 record with a 4.94 ERA in 17 appearances. He was not re-signed for the 2022 season and became a free agent.

Sultanes de Monterrey
On February 25, 2022, Rogers signed with the Sultanes de Monterrey of the Mexican League. In 14 starts, he registered a 3–5 record with a 5.60 ERA and 46 strikeouts over 72.1 innings. Rogers was released on August 1, 2022.

Mariachis de Guadalajara
On February 12, 2023, Rogers signed with the Mariachis de Guadalajara of the Mexican League.

References

External links

 

1985 births
Asheville Tourists players
Buffalo Bisons (minor league) players
Casper Rockies players
CTBC Brothers players
Colorado Rockies players
Colorado Springs Sky Sox players
Cleveland Indians players
Dominican Republic expatriate baseball players in Canada
Dominican Republic expatriate baseball players in Mexico
Dominican Republic expatriate baseball players in South Korea
Dominican Republic expatriate baseball players in Taiwan
Dominican Republic expatriate baseball players in the United States
Guerreros de Oaxaca players
Hanwha Eagles players
KBO League pitchers

Living people
Major League Baseball pitchers
Major League Baseball players from the Dominican Republic
Modesto Nuts players
New York Yankees players
Sportspeople from Santo Domingo
Tigres del Licey players
Toronto Blue Jays players
Tulsa Drillers players